Connor Undercover is a Canadian Teen action comedy TV series airing on Canadian specialty channel Family Channel. It stars Max Morrow as the title character Connor Heath. It is co-produced by Heroic Films Company and Shaftesbury Films. In early 2010, Family Channel renewed the series for a second season.

Overview

Season one 
Connor Heath is an ordinary 15-year-old. He extremely over imagines things and is always looking for adventure however he never finds any, that is until the Cordoban president's daughter is sent to live with him and his family. After numerous attempts on Gisela's life, Ed, a body-guard for the Cordoban secret service joins them. The main antagonist is former friend of Gisela, now double agent Zatari, whose mission is to capture Gisela.

Season two 
Zatari, an ex-agent has re-appeared on a mission to capture DNA from Gisela to use in illegal human cloning, causing Ed to place Gisela in a safe house, away from school and the outside world. After Connor fails his Camp X test in order to protect Gisela, he finds himself being trained by Ed to become a proper spy to be able to protect Gisela anywhere she goes.

Production 
The Family Channel Canada commissioned the series in 2008. Series one was filmed in early 2009 and first premiered on the Australian channel ABC3 on the 12 April 2010 and premiered on Family Channel on 17 September 2010. It was co-produced by Heroic Films Company and Shaftesbury Films. The Family Channel commissioned a second season of twenty-six episodes, which world premiered again on ABC3 on 11 October 2010. Although the series is Canadian, the world premiere was given to the Australian Broadcasting Corporation. The series was filmed on location in Toronto, Ontario, Canada.

Cast

Main
 Max Morrow as Connor Heath
 Lola Tash as Gisela Calicos
 Gavin Fox as Eduardo Garcia
 Jordan Francis as Dave "Whynot" Wynott
 Carleigh Beverly as Tanya Gilette
 Dylan Authors as Ty Heath
 Ana Golja as Lily Bogdakovitch

Recurring
 Howard Hoover as Reuben Heath
 Jude Coffey as Julia Heath
 Randy Thomas as President Calicos
 Raquel Cadilha as Tanya
 Will Bowes as Renford
 Marline Yan as Sophia
 Jacob Neayem as Hugo
 Tattiawna Jones as Zatari
 Kyle McDonald as Azul
 Marco Grazzini as The Messenger
 Pat Mastroianni as Diego
 Alex Karzis as The Magician

Episodes

International broadcasts

References

External links 

 Official website
 Official Facebook

2010s Canadian comedy television series
2010s Canadian teen sitcoms
2010 Canadian television series debuts
2011 Canadian television series endings
Television series by Shaftesbury Films
Family Channel (Canadian TV network) original programming
English-language television shows
Espionage television series
Television series about teenagers
Television shows filmed in Toronto
Television shows set in Toronto
Canadian action comedy television series